Wilfred Sharp (8 April 1907 – June 1981) was a Scottish professional footballer who played for Clydebank, Airdrieonians, Sheffield Wednesday and Bradford Park Avenue. Sharp was a right half whose career lasted from 1925 to 1936, he only made 65 appearances in the English League but in that time he won a FA Cup winners medal while with Sheffield Wednesday in 1935.

Playing career

Early days
Sharp was born in Bathgate, West Lothian. He played for Bathgate, Pumpherston Rangers and Kirkintilloch Rob Roy before signing as a professional for Clydebank in 1925, aged 18. He stayed at Clydeholm for four years before signing in 1929 for Airdrieonians. Sharp stayed with Airdrieonians for five years although he did have a short spell as a professional at Tunbridge Wells Rangers in 1932. In August 1934 he was spotted by Sheffield Wednesday manager Billy Walker and signed for The Owls for a fee of £750 on 11 August.

Sheffield Wednesday
Walker signed Sharp as a possible replacement for Wednesday's long-serving half back Alf Strange who at 34 years old was in the twilight of his career. Even without Strange in the team, there was strong competition for the half back positions with Horace Burrows and Gavin Malloch keeping Sharp out of the team for the early months of the 1934–35 season. However, an injury to Malloch on 1 December 1934 in a home draw with Sunderland led to Sharp making his debut the following Saturday in a 1–0 victory at Leicester. Sharp showed good form and kept Malloch out of the side for the rest of the season as Wednesday went on a fine run of results, eventually finishing third in Division One and winning the 1935 FA Cup Final. The following season saw the team struggle to avoid relegation, Sharp (who was not involved in the 1935 FA Charity Shield) played 24 matches and eventually asked for a transfer as his wife could not settle in Sheffield. In his two years at Wednesday, Sharp played 48 league games and 10 FA Cup games, scoring two goals.

Bradford Park Avenue
The hoped-for switch back to Scottish football did not materialise, and Sharp signed for Bradford Park Avenue in May 1936, playing 17 league games in his single season with them before moving to non league Burton Town in August 1937.

Sharp retired from football before the outbreak of World War II; he died in June 1981, aged 74 in Sefton, Merseyside.

References

Kirkintilloch Rob Roy F.C. players
Clydebank F.C. (1914) players
Airdrieonians F.C. (1878) players
Sheffield Wednesday F.C. players
Scottish footballers
Association football wing halves
1907 births
1981 deaths
English Football League players
Scottish Football League players
Scottish Junior Football Association players
People from Bathgate
Tunbridge Wells F.C. players
Bradford (Park Avenue) A.F.C. players
Burton Town F.C. players
Bathgate F.C. players
Footballers from West Lothian
FA Cup Final players